This is a list of flag bearers who have represented Cuba at the Olympics.

Flag bearers carry the national flag of their country at the opening ceremony of the Olympic Games.

See also
Cuba at the Olympics

References

Cuba at the Olympics
Cuba
Olympic flagbearers